Events in the year 1997 in Ukraine.

Incumbents 

 President: Leonid Kuchma
 Prime Minister: Pavlo Lazarenko (until 2 July), Vasyl Durdynets (from 2 July until 30 July), Valeriy Pustovoitenko (from 30 July)

Events 

 28 May – The Partition Treaty on the Status and Conditions of the Black Sea Fleet was signed between Russia and Ukraine.
Date unknown
Ukrainian Processing Center is founded.

Deaths 
 Oksana Ivanenko, children's writer and translator (17 December)

References 

 
Ukraine
Ukraine
1990s in Ukraine
Years of the 20th century in Ukraine